or Distant Thunder is a 1981 Japanese film adaptation of Wahei Tatematsu's novel of the same name, directed by Kichitaro Negishi.

Synopsis
Enrai is a low-key study of a farmer, Mitsuo Wada, in 1980s Japan when modernization and urbanization were threatening rural areas. After his father leaves his wife to run off with his mistress, Mitsuo struggles to preserve his livelihood with the help of his mother, grandmother, and his arranged marriage bride, Ayako.

Cast
 Toshiyuki Nagashima as Mitsuo Wada
  as Hirotsugu Nakamori
 Eri Ishida as Ayako Hanamori
  as Kaede
  as Mitsuo's father
  as Mitsuo's mother
  as Mitsuo's grandmother
 Yumiko Fujita as Chii
 Keizō Kanie as Kaede's husband

Background
Enrai is based on the 1980 novel of the same name by Wahei Tatematsu. The film, financed by ATG, Nikkatsu, and the smaller Nikkatsu-related company New Century Producers, marked director Negishi's breakthrough into mainstream film after several Roman porno features for Nikkatsu.

Awards and nominations
3rd Yokohama Film Festival 
 Won: Best Director - Kichitaro Negishi
 Won: Best Screenplay - Haruhiko Arai
 Won: Best Cinematography - Shohei Ando
 Won: Best Actor - Toshiyuki Nagashima

6th Hochi Film Awards
 Won: Best Film
 Won: Best Actor - Toshiyuki Nagashima
 Won: New Face Award - Eri Ishida

References

External links
 
 
 

1981 films
Films directed by Kichitaro Negishi
1980s Japanese-language films
1980s Japanese films